José Guadarrama Márquez is a Mexican politician recently affiliated with the Party of the Democratic Revolution (PRD) who currently serves in the upper house of the Mexican Congress.

Career
Guadarrama is a professor who had a long and notable political career in the State of Hidalgo as an Institutional Revolutionary Party (PRI) member.  He served as federal deputy from 1978 to 1982 and as senator from 1994 to 2000.  He has also occupied different position within the Government of Hidalgo.

In 1999 he unsuccessfully tried to obtain the PRI candidacy for the gubernatorial elections but was defeated by Manuel Angel Núñez Soto; In 2005 he tried again but this time he was defeated by Miguel Ángel Osorio Chong, then, following the primaries results in Hidalgo, he left the PRI and ran for governor representing the PRD; he lost the election. In 2006 he ran for senator as the Coalition for the Good of All candidate; this time he won the election therefore he was elected to serve during the LX and LXI Legislatures (2006–2012).

References

Living people
Party of the Democratic Revolution politicians
Members of the Chamber of Deputies (Mexico)
Members of the Senate of the Republic (Mexico)
Institutional Revolutionary Party politicians
21st-century Mexican politicians
Year of birth missing (living people)